The Lehman Formation is a geologic formation in Utah. It preserves fossils dating back to the Ordovician period.

See also

 List of fossiliferous stratigraphic units in Utah
 Paleontology in Utah

References

Ordovician geology of Nevada
Ordovician geology of Utah
Ordovician southern paleotropical deposits